Arianida mactata is a species of beetle in the family Cerambycidae. It was described by Léon Fairmaire in 1903. It is known from Madagascar.

References

Tragocephalini
Beetles described in 1903